North Brookfield is a hamlet in Madison County, New York, United States. North Brookfield has a post office with ZIP code 13418.

Notable person

Painter Deborah Goldsmith was born in North Brookfield.

References

Hamlets in Madison County, New York
Hamlets in New York (state)